Goodenia laevis, commonly known as smooth goodenia, is a species of flowering plant in the family Goodeniaceae and is endemic to south-western Western Australia. It is a prostrate or ascending sub-shrub with oblong to lance-shaped leaves with the narrower end towards the base and racemes or thyrses of yellow flowers with purplish markings.

Description

Taxonomy and naming
Goodenia laevis was first formally described in 1868 by George Bentham in Flora Australiensis from specimens collected by George Maxwell in the "Phillips Ranges". The specific epithet (laevis) means "smooth".

In 1998, Leigh William Sage described two subspecies of G. laevis in the journal Nuytsia and the names are accepted by the Australian Plant Census:

The name (humifusa) means "lying down", referring to the prostrate habit of this subspecies.

Distribution and habitat
Smooth goodenia grows in open mallee shrubland. Subspecies humifusa occurs between Ravensthorpe, Jerramungup, Dumbleyung and north to Digger Rocks. Subspecies laevis is found between Esperance, Scadden and north to Mount Ley.

Conservation status
Goddenia laevis is classified as "not threatened" by the Department of Environment and Conservation (Western Australia) but subspecies laevis is classified as "Priority Three", meaning that it is poorly known and known from only a few locations but is not under imminent threat.

References

laevis
Eudicots of Western Australia
Plants described in 1868
Taxa named by George Bentham